Channapatna Assembly constituency of Karnataka Assembly is one of the constituencies located in the Ramanagara district.

It is a part of the Bangalore Rural Lok Sabha constituency, along with eight other assembly constituencies.
Channapatna constituency is well known for many important personalities in Karnataka politics. The first education minister of then Mysore State, Sri M V Venkatappa was basically from this constituency.

Members of Legislative Assembly

References

Assembly constituencies of Karnataka
Ramanagara district